Patryk Królczyk (born 10 May 1994) is a Polish professional footballer who plays as a goalkeeper for Spanish club Gran Tarajal.

Career

For the second half of the 2013–14 season, Królczyk left the reserves of German Bundesliga side Augsburg and signed for III liga club Nadwiślan Góra.

In 2019, he joined Ekstraklasa side Piast Gliwice from Warta Gorzów Wielkopolski.

References

External links
 Patryk Królczyk at 90minut

Association football goalkeepers
Living people
1994 births
Polish footballers
Polish expatriate footballers
People from Wodzisław County
FC Augsburg II players
Olimpia Grudziądz players
Piast Gliwice players
GKS Katowice players
Hutnik Nowa Huta players
I liga players
II liga players
Regionalliga players
Polish expatriate sportspeople in Germany
Expatriate footballers in Germany
Polish expatriate sportspeople in Spain
Expatriate footballers in Spain